The Alabaster City Schools (ACS) is the school district of the Birmingham, Alabama, suburb of Alabaster. Alabaster City School District serves 6,187 students and employs 354 teachers and 351 staff as of the 2020-2021 school year. The district includes two elementary schools, one intermediate school, one middle school, and one high school.

History 
In April 2011, the Alabaster City Council commissioned a $32,000 feasibility study of the city forming its own school district by Ira Harvey of Decision Resources. Harvey delivered the study that September, finding that Alabaster was well-positioned to create its own system, but should implement a 1-cent sales tax increase to do so. After a month of discussion amongst the council and with citizens, the city council voted on October 17, 2011 to both create the school board and raise the city sales tax from 3% to 4% to support it.

In January 2012, the city council's education committee began interviewing the 32 applicants for the new Alabaster Board of Education. On March 26, 2012, the first board was sworn in. It consisted of Linda Church, Melanie Shores, John Myrick, Tyrone Quarles, and former city councilor Adam Moseley. Moseley resigned from the city council to take the position, as Alabama state law prohibits one person serving in both bodies at once.

In January 2013, the board hired former Jefferson County Schools superintendent Phil Hammonds as interim superintendent. Hammonds had spent the previous six months as part-time coordinator of administrative services for the group and had retired from his position as Jefferson County superintendent the month before. By that time it had been decided that Alabaster would begin its first school year that fall. State law allowed the board to hire an interim superintendent for six months while it sought someone to fill the position permanently.

On May 1, the board announced it had chosen Saraland superintendent Wayne Vickers as the system's first permanent superintendent. Vickers, one of 16 applicants for the permanent position, had overseen Saraland schools after that city voted to separate from the Mobile County Schools system.

The board also voted in May to have Alabaster officially separate from Shelby County Schools on July 1, 2013. Out-of-town students currently attending what would become Alabaster schools will be slowly transferred to county schools through 2020. Out-of-town students in sixth grade for the 2013–14 school year will be permitted to stay through 12th grade. Alabaster students attending the Linda Nolen Learning Center in Pelham will continue attending it until 2020 and those attending the Shelby County School of Technology in Columbiana will be able to stay through graduation. The only unresolved matter was what to do with the Shelby County Instructional Services Center located in Alabaster, as both systems wanted to keep it. That matter will therefore be decided by the Alabama Superintendent of Education's office.

The new school system opened to students on August 19, 2013. In celebration of the new system, on September 25 Thompson High School held its first homecoming parade in 50 years.

Schools 
The Alabaster City School District consists of five schools:
 Creek View Elementary School (PK-3)
 Meadow View Elementary School (PK-3)
 Thompson Intermediate School (4-5)
 Thompson Middle School (6-8)
 Thompson High School (9-12)

Governance 
The Alabaster Board of Education currently operates with five members. Mr. Adam Moseley (President), Mr. Derek Henderson (Vice-President), Dr. John Myrick, Ms. Jamia Alexander-Williams, and Ms. Misty Johnson serve staggered contracts of 5 years. On May 1, 2013, the board approved Dr. Wayne Vickers as the system’s first superintendent.

References

External links 
 Alabaster City Schools website

School districts in Alabama
Education in Jefferson County, Alabama
School districts established in 2013
2013 establishments in Alabama